The 2000–01 Marquette Warriors men's basketball team represented Marquette University during the 2000–01 men's college basketball season. Their head coach was Tom Crean. The Golden Eagles finished the regular season with a record of 15–14, 9—7.

Preseason
Coach Crean returned four starters from the previous season, where the Golden Eagles went 15-14 and went to the 2000 NIT. The team's chances were dealt a blow when top freshman Dwyane Wade was declared ineligible after failing to achieve a qualifying SAT/ACT score.  Marquette was picked fifth in the Conference USA American division while senior guard Brian Wardle was named to the preseason all-conference team.

Regular season
During the February 22, 2001 game against DePaul, Marquette held "Al McGuire night," honoring the school's Hall of Fame former coach, who had died the month before. As a part of the event, the court at the Bradley Center was renamed "Al McGuire Court."

Roster

Schedule

|-
!colspan=9 style=| Conference USA tournament

External links
MUScoop's MUWiki

References 

Marquette
Marquette
Marquette Golden Eagles men's basketball seasons
Marquette